99 Songs of Revolution: Vol. 1 is the fourth studio album by the American ska punk band Streetlight Manifesto, released March 16, 2010. It was proposed to be the first part of a multi-album cover songs project by several associated acts including Bandits of the Acoustic Revolution, although no other parts have been released as of 2022.

Background
99 Songs of Revolution was originally thought to be only a Bandits of the Acoustic Revolution release, as stated in the liner notes for their debut 2001 EP, A Call to Arms. Not much was known about the project until September 2008, when the project was officially and publicly announced. It was revealed that 99 Songs of Revolution would feature 99 cover songs spread out over eight full-length albums from four different artists. The plan was for each of the four bands, Bandits of the Acoustic Revolution, Streetlight Manifesto and two currently unknown "Streetlight Manifesto related" artists, to release two albums in the series.

Composition
Volume one features two songs written by Paul Simon, "Me and Julio Down by the Schoolyard" and "Red Rubber Ball".  "Red Rubber Ball" was originally released by The Cyrkle in 1966. Simon and Garfunkel recorded a live version in 1967 that was not released until 1997. 

The album art contains a visual element for each track. For example, the Newsweek stand is a reference to a lyric in "Me and Julio Down by the Schoolyard" and the gravestone marked "Willie" is a reference to the antagonist in "The Troubadour".

Release
The project saw many tentative release dates in 2008 and 2009. Toward the end of 2009, Streetlight Manifesto announced that the first CD had been completed as was awaiting release from the record label. The band also hinted at the possibility of self-releasing the album on vinyl through the Pentimento Music Company "long before" their label could release it on CD. Also in late 2009, Streetlight Manifesto began previewing their songs from 99 Songs of Revolution on their website and during live performances. On February 8, 2010, 99 Songs of Revolution: Vol. 1 was announced for release the following month. On February 17, 2010, the album's track listing was posted online. It was released on March 16, 2010, through Victory Records. "Me and Julio Down by the Schoolyard" was released as a single a week prior to the first volume's release.

Between June and August 2010, the band went on a headlining US tour with support from the Wonder Years, Dan Potthast of MU330 and Crime in Stereo. Following this, they performed at the Reading and Leeds Festivals in the UK.

Track listing

Personnel 
Streetlight Manifesto
 Mike Brown – alto saxophone, baritone saxophone, backing vocals
 Jim Conti – alto saxophone, tenor saxophone, backing vocals, clarinet
 Tomas Kalnoky – vocals, guitar, ukulele, recording engineer, mixing engineer
 Pete McCullough – bass guitar, backing vocals
 Mike Soprano – trombone, backing vocals
 Matt Stewart – trumpet, backing vocals
 Chris Thatcher – drums
Additional Musicians and Production
 Achilles Kalnoky – violin
 Doug Holzapfel – organ
 Dave Fowler – organ
 Demian Arriaga – auxiliary percussion
 Dan Potthast – gang vocals
 Lance Reynolds – gang vocals
 Jason Kanter – mixing engineer
 Alan Douches – mastering engineer

Chart performance

References

External links

99 Songs of Revolution: Vol. 1 at YouTube (streamed copy where licensed)
 Official Streetlight Manifesto website

Covers albums
2010 albums
Streetlight Manifesto albums
Tomas Kalnoky albums
Victory Records albums